Francesco Zanoni (died 1782) was an Italian painter and restorer active mainly in Padua. He mainly worked on sacred works including at Santa Maria in Vanzo, Padua.

References

Painters from Padua
18th-century Italian painters
Italian male painters
1782 deaths
18th-century Italian male artists